Souris Regional School, is a Canadian public school located in Souris, Prince Edward Island.   The school instructs students from Kindergarten to Grade 12.  The school serves the north eastern part of Kings County.

Souris Regional School has adopted maroon and gold as its official colours.   Its mascot is a Spartan and sports teams are called the Souris Spartans.

History and characteristics
 In 1961, the Souris Regional High School instructing students in grades 9-12 was officially opened by Premier Walter R. Shaw.
 In 1984, a section of Souris Regional High School was demolished and a new section added containing classrooms, cafeteria, gymnasium, and an area for vocational training in carpentry, welding and motor vehicle repair.
 Beginning with the 2009 academic year, Souris Regional High School changed to grades 8-12; this was due to the closure of several smaller consolidated (K-8) schools in Kings County.
In 2011 the provincial government approved a request from the school board to close and demolish the Souris Consolidated School (grades K-7) and to renovate and build an addition onto the Souris Regional High School building in order to accommodate a total of 625 students (grades K-12). Planning and design was completed in 2012 and construction took place in 2013–2014.
The school was renamed Souris Regional School and students from grades K-12 began attending class in 2014.

Souris Regional School is currently the second smallest in the province in terms of student enrollment.

Extracurricular activities

Sports
Varsity sports at Souris Regional School include:
boys and girls Basketball
boys and girls Rugby
boys and girls Cross Country
boys and girls Soccer
boys and girls Softball
boys and girls Track & Field
boys and girls Badminton
boys and girls Powerlifting
girls Softball
girls Volleyball

Clubs
Souris Regional School has several extracurricular clubs:
Blood For Life Club
Grad Activity Committee
Prom Committee
Readers' Circle
Robotics
Rotary Youth Parliament
SADD
SAVE
Caring Hearts

Notable alumni
Ross Young '84: a member of the legislative assembly of Prince Edward Island. died in 2021.

See also
List of schools in Prince Edward Island
List of school districts in Prince Edward Island

References 

High schools in Prince Edward Island
Schools in Kings County, Prince Edward Island
Educational institutions established in 1955
1955 establishments in Prince Edward Island